Wigrid is an underground black metal project that was founded by Ulfhednir in 1998. The name is taken from the field Vígríðr, where the battle of Ragnarok will be fought according to the Norse mythos.

History

Early years (1998–2004)
Wigrid was founded in 1998 by Ulfhednir as a one-man project in Saarbrücken, Germany. After the band was created, the first demo, "Die Totgeburt Jesu Christi", was released. This demo contained five songs and was never officially published. In the early months of 1999, the second Wigrid demo, "Ort Der Einsamkeit", was recorded. About a year later, the demo "Hoffnungstod" was completed. It was then officially released on CD and LP in 2002.

Recent Years (2005-present)
In 2005 Wigrid released its second full-length album titled "Die Asche eines Lebens", before going on a lengthy hiatus during which Ulfhednir was active in a variety of other bands and projects. He did not make his comeback until July 2014, when Wigrid released a split CD album on Bleeding Heart Nihilist Productions together with the band Sunshine & Lollipops from Berlin, Germany. It contains two new and previously unreleased tracks by Wigrid.

Musical style and lyrical themes 
Ulfhednir has claimed to be influenced mostly by the solo-project Burzum. He also has stated that his early demos were loosely influenced by Darkthrone and some Graveland albums. However, these influences pertain solely to the musical side of Wigrid. The lyrics are written in German and largely concerned with subjects like misanthropy, despair, nihilism, depression and other psychological considerations on an introspective, personal level.

Discography 
 Die Totgeburt Jesu Christi (1998), Self-released – Demo
 Ort der Einsamkeit (1999), Self-released – Demo
 Hoffnungstod (2000), Self-released – Demo
 Hoffnungstod (2002), No Colours Records
 Die Asche eines Lebens (2005), No Colours Records
 Split the Indifference (Geteilte Gleichgültigkeit) (2014), Bleeding Heart Nihilist Productions – Split with Sunshine & Lollipops
 Entfremdungsmoment (2019), Bleeding Heart Nihilist Productions

External links 
 
 Wigrid at Encyclopaedia Metallum

German black metal musical groups
Musical groups established in 1998

de:Wigrid
es:Wigrid